Mad Hot Ballroom is a 2005 American documentary film directed and co-produced by Marilyn Agrelo and written and co-produced by Amy Sewell, about a ballroom dance program in the New York City Department of Education, the New York City public school system for fifth graders. Several styles of dance are shown in the film, such as tango, foxtrot, swing, rumba and merengue.

Synopsis

Based on a feature article written by Sewell, Mad Hot Ballroom looks inside the lives of 11-year-old New York City public school kids who journey into the world of ballroom dancing and reveal pieces of themselves along the way. Told from the students' perspectives as the children strive toward the final citywide competition, the film chronicles the experiences of students at three schools in the neighborhoods of Tribeca, Bensonhurst and Washington Heights. The students are united by an interest in the ballroom dancing lessons, which builds over a 10-week period and culminates in a competition to find the school that has produced the best dancers in the city. As the teachers cajole their students to learn the intricacies of the various disciplines, Agrelo intersperses classroom footage with the students' musings on life; many of these reveal an underlying maturity.

Release
The documentary premiered at the 2005 Slamdance Film Festival in Park City, Utah and was purchased by Paramount Classics and Nickelodeon Movies. It had a limited theatrical release in the United States on May 13, 2005. Mad Hot Ballroom was the second highest grossing documentary in 2005 after March of the Penguins. As of February7, 2012, it had earned over $8.1 million, making it the sixteenth-highest-grossing documentary film in the United States (in nominal dollars, from 1982 to the present).

Reception

Critical reception
On the review aggregator website Rotten Tomatoes, the film holds an 84% certified fresh approval rating, based on 121 reviews. The website's consensus reads, "This heartwarming documentary will win audiences over, as the sheer charm of precocious, enthusiastic children learning to dance resonates from the screen."

Awards
Awards bestowed upon Mad Hot Ballroom include:
The Christopher Award in 2006
Best Documentary at the Karlovy Vary International Film Festival in 2005
The Audience Award at the Philadelphia Film Festival
Satellite Award for Best Documentary Feature in 2005

See also
Pierre Dulaine

References

External links

2005 films
2005 documentary films
American dance films
Ballroom dancing films
Documentary films about children
Documentary films about dance
Documentary films about education in the United States
Documentary films about competitions
Documentary films about New York City
Films about dance competitions
Films set in Brooklyn
Paramount Vantage films
Public education in New York City
Nickelodeon Movies films
Films about the education system in the United States
2005 directorial debut films
Films directed by Marilyn Agrelo
2000s English-language films
2000s American films